Rotherley Downs is a 120.05 hectare biological Site of Special Scientific Interest in Wiltshire, England, notified in 1989.

The site consists of two north–south aligned combes – Rotherley Bottom and Malacombe Bottom.  Most of the site is in Berwick St John parish, with a western portion in Tollard Royal parish.

References

External links
 English Nature website (SSSI information)

Sites of Special Scientific Interest in Wiltshire
Sites of Special Scientific Interest notified in 1989